Kotenko is a Ukrainian surname. Notable people with the surname include:

 Artur Kotenko (born 1981), Estonian footballer
 Ivan Kotenko (born 1985), Ukrainian footballer
 Sergey Kotenko (born 1956), Kazakhstani water polo player
 Serhiy Kotenko (1967–2022), Ukrainian colonel

See also
 

Ukrainian-language surnames